Tyagi originally called Taga, is a cultivator caste who claim Brahmin status. The landholding community is confined to Western Uttar Pradesh, Haryana, Delhi and Rajasthan. They are often considered the highest of the agricultural castes. During the British Raj, they changed their name from Taga to Tyagi, and began claiming Brahmin status. As of a 1990 report by the Backward Classes Commission, Government of Haryana, they were mostly engaged in farming.

The name Tyagi is prevalent in both Hindu and Muslim communities. Community members who converted to Islam are known as Muslim Tyagis, Mulla Brahmin, Musalman Taga, Mahesra and Moolay Taga.

References

Further reading

Indian castes
Agricultural castes
Indian surnames
Social groups of Rajasthan
Social groups of Haryana
Social groups of Delhi
Social groups of Uttar Pradesh
Social groups of Uttarakhand
Social groups of Pakistan